Kai Müller (born 20 July 1988 in Magdeburg) is a German slalom canoeist who has competed at the international level since 2004, exclusively in the C2 class alongside his twin brother Kevin.

He won two medals in the C2 team event at the ICF Canoe Slalom World Championships with a silver in 2015 and a bronze in 2010. He also won a silver and three bronzes in the same event at the European Championships.

References

2010 ICF Canoe Slalom World Championships 11 September 2010 C2 men's team final results. - accessed 11 September 2010.

External links 

 Kai MÜLLER at CanoeSlalom.net

German male canoeists
Living people
1988 births
Sportspeople from Magdeburg
Medalists at the ICF Canoe Slalom World Championships